Hegelochus (fl. 408 BC) was an Ancient Greek actor active in Athens in the 5th century BC, best remembered for a slight pronunciation mistake that derailed his career.

Orestes

Hegelochus acted in the play  by Euripides when it was performed in the City Dionysia dramatic festival in 408 BC. He was playing the title role of Orestes. In line 279 of the play, instead of "after the storm I see again a calm sea", Hegelochus recited "after the storm I see again a weasel". 

Hegelochus' mistake was to use a rising-falling tone instead of a rising tone. This can be explained by his running out of breath and failing to make the elision. Moreover, the weasel was an unlucky animal, contrasting with the optimistic intent of the line.

This error was widely mocked, Hegelochus was ruined, and he never acted again. It may also have contributed to Euripides leaving Athens.

Mentions

References

Ancient Greek actors